The First International Congress on World Evangelization (ICOWE), also sometimes called the Lausanne Congress or Lausanne '74, was held from 16 to 25 July 1974.

The conference is noted for producing the Lausanne Covenant, one of the major documents of modern evangelical Christianity. The drafting committee of the covenant was headed by John Stott of England.

History
The congress was a conference of some 2,700 evangelical Christian leaders that was held in the Palais de Beaulieu in Lausanne, Switzerland, in 1974 to discuss the progress, resources and methods of evangelizing the world. The conference was called by a committee headed by American evangelist Billy Graham and brought together religious leaders from 150 nations. The reports and papers at the congress helped to illustrate the shift of Christianity's center of gravity from Europe and North America to Africa, Asia and Latin America.

Lausanne was selected for the congress in October 1972. The congress office opened in April 1973. The theme of the congress was "Let the earth hear His voice." The congress started as a plan announced by Billy Graham in August 1972 to hold an international congress on evangelism as a follow-up to the 1966 World Congress on Evangelism held in Berlin, West Germany. Millie Dienert chaired the prayer committee at the Lausanne conference. After the congress, the Lausanne Committee for World Evangelization was established.

The Second International Congress on World Evangelization was held fifteen years later in Manila.

The movement claims to follow in the footsteps of the 1910 World Missionary Conference. The Third International Congress on World Evangelization was held in Cape Town, South Africa, from 16 to 25 October 2010.

References

External links 
 The Lausanne Committee for World Evangelization
 Text of the Lausanne Covenant in English and links to translations
 The Billy Graham Center's Record Index

International Congress on World Evangelization
1974 in Switzerland
20th-century church councils
1974 in Christianity
1974 conferences
Billy Graham
Evangelicalism in Switzerland
Evangelism
Protestant councils and synods

zh:洛桑世界宣教大會#第一屆世界福音宣教大會